The 4th Politburo of the Communist Party of Vietnam (CPV), formally the 4th Political Bureau of the Central Committee of the Communist Party of Vietnam (Vietnamese: Bộ Chính trị Ban Chấp hành trung ương Đảng Cộng sản Việt Nam Khoá IV), was elected at the 1st Plenary Session of the 4th Central Committee in the immediate aftermath of the 4th National Congress.

Composition

Members

Alternates

References

Bibliography
 Chân dung 19 ủy viên Bộ Chính trị khóa XII

.4
1976 in Vietnam
1982 in Vietnam